The Boeing B-54 was an American strategic bomber designed by Boeing for use by the United States Air Force. Derived from the 
YB-50C Superfortress, construction of the prototype was canceled before completion, and the aircraft was never flown.

Design and development
Begun in 1947, the B-54 was the planned production version of the YB-50C prototype. Large fuel tanks under the outboard wing section were required to carry an additional  of fuel to reach the intended  range; 14 .50-caliber machine guns comprised the specified defensive armament.

On May 29, 1948, contracts were placed by the Air Force for 21 B-54A bombers and 52 RB-54A reconnaissance aircraft; However, on April 18, 1949, the B-54 project was cancelled due to the development of better-performing jet aircraft; construction of the prototype B-54A had started at Seattle but was never completed. The cancellation was lambasted by the Seattle press, who claimed that it was a political decision instead of a military one.

Variants
B-54A Intended production version of the YB-50C
RB-54A Reconnaissance version

Specifications

See also

References

Notes

Citations

Bibliography

 .

 Swanborough, F. G. and Peter M. Bowers. United States Military Aircraft since 1909. Washington, DC: Smithsonian Institution Press, 1989. .

B-54
Cancelled military aircraft projects of the United States
Four-engined tractor aircraft
B-54
Mid-wing aircraft
Four-engined piston aircraft